Gaby Bußmann (born 8 October 1959 in Haltern) is a German athlete who specialized in the 400 metres.

She competed for West Germany at the 1984 Summer Olympics held in Los Angeles, U.S. where she won the bronze medal in the women's 4 x 400 metres with her team mates Heike Schulte-Mattler, Ute Thimm and Heidi-Elke Gaugel.

She became West German champion in 1978, 1978, 1982 and 1983, and won silver medals in 1984 and 1986. She represented the clubs ASV Köln, LG Ahlen-Hamm and SC Eintracht Hamm. Indoors she became German champion in 1979, 1981 and 1982.

References

External links

1959 births
Living people
People from Haltern
Sportspeople from Münster (region)
West German female sprinters
Olympic bronze medalists for West Germany
Athletes (track and field) at the 1984 Summer Olympics
Olympic athletes of West Germany
World Athletics Championships athletes for West Germany
Medalists at the 1984 Summer Olympics
Olympic bronze medalists in athletics (track and field)
ASV Köln athletes
LG Ahlen-Hamm athletes
SC Eintracht Hamm athletes
Olympic female sprinters